Rhizobium hainanense is a Gram negative root nodule bacteria. Strain CCBAU 57015 (166) is the type strain.

References

Further reading

External links

LPSN
Type strain of Rhizobium hainanense at BacDive -  the Bacterial Diversity Metadatabase

Rhizobiaceae
Bacteria described in 1997